Leandro Soria (born October 29, 2004) is an American professional soccer player who plays as a winger for Argentine Primera División club Godoy Cruz Antonio Tomba.

Early life 
Born in Queens, New York City, from an Argentine family who had left their country a few years earlier during the great depression, Soria moved back to Argentina when he was two years old.

Club career 
Soria made his professional debut for Godoy Cruz on November 6, 2021, replacing Matías Ramírez during a 2–0 home defeat against Primera División contenders Talleres de Córdoba.

International career 
A dual citizen of the United States and Argentina, Soria stated his desire to play for the former at under-20 level in November 2021.

References

External links

2004 births
Living people
Soccer players from New York City
American soccer players
Association football midfielders
American people of Argentine descent
Citizens of Argentina through descent
Argentine footballers
Godoy Cruz Antonio Tomba footballers
Argentine Primera División players